The harlequin quail (Coturnix delegorguei) is a species of bird in the family Phasianidae. It occurs in sub-Saharan Africa and in the Arabian Peninsula. The species is named after the collector, Adulphe Delegorgue.

Taxonomy
 
There are three subspecies:
C. d. arabica Bannerman, 1929 – Southwest Arabian Peninsula 	 
C. d. delegorguei Delegorgue, 1847 – Sub-Saharan Africa and Madagascar
C. d. histrionica Hartlaub, 1849 – São Tomé Island, Gulf of Guinea

Introductions
The uncontrolled introduction of domestic Japanese quail breeds into Kenya, as well as a noticeable population size reduction of wild African harlequin quail numbers in parts of Western Kenya has been reported.

References

External links
 Harlequin quail - Species text in The Atlas of Southern African Birds

harlequin quail
Birds of the Gulf of Guinea
Birds of Sub-Saharan Africa
Birds of the Middle East
harlequin quail
Taxonomy articles created by Polbot